Raiber Rodríguez Orozco (born December 28, 1990) is a Venezuelan Greco-Roman wrestler. He competed in the men's Greco-Roman 59 kg event at the 2016 Summer Olympics, in which he was eliminated by Rovshan Bayramov.

References

External links
 

1990 births
Living people
Venezuelan male sport wrestlers
Olympic wrestlers of Venezuela
Wrestlers at the 2016 Summer Olympics
20th-century Venezuelan people
21st-century Venezuelan people